The National University of Kaohsiung (NUK) is a public university located in Kaohsiung, Taiwan, and a member of the National University System of Taiwan.

History 
NUK was founded in February 2000, aims to narrow the gap in education between southern and northern Taiwan and promote the economy of the southern area.

There are twenty departments in the university, including Western Languages and Literature, East Asian Language and Literature, Architecture, Creative Design, Kinesiology, Health and Leisure Studies, Law, Government and Law, Economic and Financial Law, Applied Economics, Applied Mathematics, Applied Chemistry, Electrical Engineering, Civil and Environmental Engineering, Life Sciences, and Asia-Pacific Industrial and Business Management, Traditional Arts, Finance, Information Management, and Applied physics.

Ranking

Features 
An unusual feature in this school is its open space. There are no walls on the boundaries of the campus. Residents who live around this school often walk to campus or exercise by using equipment in the gym. Biodiversity is also a notable characteristic of NUK. There are more than 60 sorts of fish in pond of the Water Land Park.

Academics 
NUK has five colleges:
{| style="white-space: nowrap;"
|-style="vertical-align:top;"
| style="vertical-align:top;"|

References

Relevant articles 
 National University System of Taiwan
 National Sun Yat-sen University

External links 

 National University of Kaohsiung

2000 establishments in Taiwan
Educational institutions established in 2000
Universities and colleges in Kaohsiung
Universities and colleges in Taiwan
Comprehensive universities in Taiwan